Courtney Alexis Stodden (born August 29, 1994) is an American media personality, model, and singer. After competing in beauty pageants in their home state of Washington and releasing original music, then-16-year-old Stodden came to international attention after being wed to 51-year-old actor Doug Hutchison in 2011. The controversy and media attention surrounding the marriage led Stodden to appear on the reality television shows Couples Therapy (2012) and Celebrity Big Brother (2013), and later appearances on Reality Ex-Wives (2015), The Mother/Daughter Experiment (2016), Celebs Go Dating (2017), and Courtney (2020).

Early life 
Courtney Alexis Stodden was born on August 29, 1994, in Tacoma, Washington to Krista Kay Keller and Alex John Stodden.
They have two sisters, Ashley and Brittany, 9 and 11 years older than Stodden. Stodden describes their childhood as "beautiful and fun", stating that they were "extremely spoiled, in a good way." From a very young age, Stodden has stated that their passion was singing and writing their own music. They were raised in Ocean Shores, Washington.

In 2017, Stodden said to Radar Online that they were bullied and abused over their mature looks from age 12 when they were in the sixth grade until their mother pulled them out of school at 16. Bullies had reportedly attacked them and fractured their left arm and they felt unsafe. They continued their education by being home schooled through an online private Christian academy.

Career

2009–2014 
Stodden began in the entertainment industry as a youth by modeling. In 2009, Stodden hosted a cable access TV show produced by North Beach Community TV in Ocean Shores, The Courtney Stodden Show, which ran for five episodes. In October 2009, Stodden competed as Miss Ocean Shores Teen USA in the 2010 Miss Washington Teen USA pageant, though she did not win the title. In 2010, Stodden released the original songs "Car Candy", "Crazy", "Don't Put It on Me", "Hurting People", and "We Are America". Star Observer ranked "Don't Put It on Me" as number eleven on their list of The 11 Best Songs of '11. Stodden said, "'Don't Put It On Me' is a kind of tongue-in-cheek song that I didn't take seriously at all, but it obviously had a good message to it." Stodden's mother, Krista Keller, initially served as Stodden's manager, but quit in May 2015, citing "creative differences". During their marriage, Stodden was managed by Hutchison.

In July 2012, Stodden and Hutchison were interviewed about their relationship on the Fox talk show Father Albert, in an episode of ABC's Good Morning America, and E! News.

The couple appeared as cast members in the second season of the VH1 reality television series Couples Therapy, which premiered in October 2012. The series features publicly known couples receiving therapy for relationship problems. According to Stodden, the couple enrolled in therapy to resolve "age-difference issues such as communication." Despite criticism leveled at the couple, Dr. Jenn Berman, the marriage, family, and child therapist who worked with the couple during their appearance on the show, opined that she did not believe that Hutchison deliberately sought out young people, saying, "He's not a predator. He's not someone, who if Courtney left him, would be trolling the Internet or high schools for underage girls. That's not his m.o. This is not a guy who was seeking out teenagers. He was teaching a class, she wanted to be an actress, it was an acting class ... And that's how it started."

Though Berman was eventually surprised by the dynamic between the two, she commented on her initial hesitations about working with the couple, saying, "I believe it was the wrong decision to let a 16-year-old marry a man in his 50s. It's uncomfortable to see... [at first] I said to my producer, 'I think this guy is a pedophile...I don't know if I can work with these people.' I don't condone it, but I do see that this is a married couple that is genuinely married and she has marital issues that needed to be worked on. I came in saying, 'She's a victim, he's a predator.' What I found out was that she has a lot more power in this relationship and he is far more powerless than I expected. His family has completely disowned him... He unfortunately has nothing besides her." Hutchison was also defended by Stodden's mother, Krista Keller, who praised Hutchison for the kindness with which he treats Stodden.

In August 2013, Stodden became a housemate on the twelfth season of the British version of Celebrity Big Brother but was evicted on Day 21, two days before the season finale, after receiving the fewest votes to save against Carol McGiffin, Louie Spence, Mario Falcone and Vicky Entwistle.

That October, Stodden appeared in a photo-op for PETA, which depicted them wearing a lettuce bikini to promote vegetarianism.

On March 18, 2014, the video for 50 Cent's "Don't Worry Bout It" was released, featuring a cameo appearance by Stodden. That August, Stodden appeared in an episode of the Reelz reality television series Hollywood Hillbillies.

2015–present 

On May 14, 2015, Vivid Entertainment released a solo sex tape created by Stodden. Stodden stated that they would donate what they were paid to charity.

On August 19, 2015, Rich Kid Mafia (RKM), a Los Angeles-based entertainment company whose primary services include artist management, digital marketing and music production, signed Stodden to an exclusive international management and development deal. Stodden appeared alongside their mother in the 2016 Lifetime series The Mother/Daughter Experiment: Celebrity Edition. The same year, Stodden made their feature film debut in the independent film Love Addict.

In 2018, Stodden announced they were recording an extended play (EP) record, which they likened to "Lil Peep meets Lana Del Rey." In March 2018, discussing their separation from husband Hutchison, they admitted to often "playing a caricature" with the media, which they likened to the personas of Anna Nicole Smith and Marilyn Monroe: "I decided, at 23, that 'I'm not gonna play this anymore. I'm just going to be myself.'" They said. "I want to be honest [now], and potentially help people."

In 2019, Stodden signed a deal with FNL Network to star in a self-titled reality show created by director Rocco Leo Gaglioti.

In March 2020 Stodden finalized their divorce with Hutchinson. Stodden spent their time during the COVID-19 pandemic working on a memoir, recording a new album, starting a cosmetics line, and running an OnlyFans account.

In May 2021, Stodden said that in 2011 television personality Chrissy Teigen tweeted and privately messaged them urging them to kill themselves. Teigen subsequently apologized to Stodden, saying she was sad and mortified at her past self, whom she described as "an insecure, attention seeking troll." Stodden accepted her apology but deemed it an attempt to save Teigen's business partnerships. A month later, Teigen released another apology in a lengthy blog post admitting to cyberbullying.

Personal life 
Stodden is a vegetarian, explaining that they "never felt right eating animals before". Another reason for their vegetarianism was thought to be lactose intolerance, as Stodden explained in a Couples Therapy bonus clip. In 2014, it was further clarified that they were not lactose intolerant, and empathy for animals was the sole reason for their vegetarianism. Stodden had attempted to follow a vegan diet, but chose instead to follow a vegetarian diet due to fewer food restrictions. Stodden has promoted the vegetarian lifestyle on PETA's behalf.

Stodden has said in interviews that they identify as a Christian. They commented: "I am a Christian girl. It may come as a surprise to some people that I support gay marriage. I believe wholeheartedly in 'Do not judge others.' Let people live their lives and be happy. That's what the bible teaches—love one another." Stodden has also said they are bisexual.

In June 2013, Stodden had breast augmentation surgery to increase their breast size from a size C to a size DD. By March 2022, they had the implants removed, telling Newsweek that they did so due to back pain.

In April 2021, Stodden publicly came out as non-binary and announced the decision to change their gender pronouns to they/them. They later updated their pronouns to she/they in June 2022.

Relationships 
At age 16, Stodden signed up on the Internet for an acting workshop taught by actor Doug Hutchison, on the recommendation of a friend of their maternal aunt, who worked in Hollywood, and knew Hutchison. Hutchison, who was not aware that Stodden was a minor, began a courtship with them over the Internet that lasted between four and six months, during which they fell in love before having met in person. After Hutchison became aware of Stodden's age, he told their mother, Krista, who had monitored their online exchanges, and was aware of their relationship and their age difference, that he would cease his relationship with Stodden if their parents disapproved. Their parents, citing Stodden's "devout Christianity", allowed them to make their own decision.

On May 20, 2011, Stodden married Hutchison in Las Vegas, Nevada. Stodden was his third wife. Their relationship drew controversy and criticism, as Stodden was 16 when they married 50-year-old Hutchison, who had been labeled a "pedophile" and "predator". It was also reported that Stodden's father was four years younger than his son-in-law Hutchison. According to Hutchison, as a result of his marriage to Stodden, his agent quit, his family disowned him and he received death threats.

On November 1, 2013, the media reported that Stodden and Hutchison were ending their marriage of two and a half years. Stodden later told Fox News that their 34-year age gap was a primary contributing factor for their divorce. In August 2014, the couple announced that they had reconciled, with plans to renew their wedding vows later that year.

It was announced on May 17, 2016, that Stodden and Hutchison were expecting their first child. In July, around three months into their pregnancy, Stodden announced they had suffered a miscarriage. On May 20, 2016, the pair celebrated their fifth anniversary by renewing their wedding vows.

In January 2017, it was reported that Stodden and Hutchison had separated, but were still living together. In March 2018, Stodden filed for divorce and did not request spousal support. Their divorce was finalized in March 2020 as Stodden announced on their Instagram, with Stodden stating that they felt "absolutely taken advantage of" and "groomed", which they stated began when he reached out to them via email. Stodden made this accusation in a March 2022 interview, along with the statement that Hutchison was emotionally abusive and at times physically abusive, commenting, "I think that's the ultimate power a groomer has over a child. That emotional abuse and control." Hutchison, however, stated in a 2011 interview that Stodden contacted him via email first.

On May 28, 2021, Stodden got engaged to their partner, entrepreneur Chris Sheng.

Filmography

Television

As themself

Film

Music videos 
"Car Candy" (2010)
"Don't Put It on Me" (2010)
"Reality" (2012)
"Mistletoe Bikini" (2016)
"Glass of Wine" (2017) (Us Weekly exclusive)
 "For You" (2018) (credited as Ember)

Discography

Singles 
"Car Candy" (2010)
"Don't Put It On Me" (2010)
"Reality" (2012)
"Asphalt" (2016)
"Mistletoe Bikini" (2016)
"Orange Juice and Pink Pills" (2018)
"Sixteen" (2018) (credited as Ember)
"Me Too" (2018) (credited as Ember)
"Pink Flamingo" (2018) (credited as Ember)
"For You" (2018) (credited as Ember)
"Daddy Issues" (2018)
"Hot 'n Juicy" (2019)
"Freak Alert" (2019)
"Side Effects" (2020)
"Butterfly" (2020)
"Pleasure" (2021)

Albums 
 Off the Record (2018) (credited as Ember)

Notes

References

External links 

1994 births
21st-century American actors
21st-century American singers
Actors from Tacoma, Washington
American child actors
American child models
American child singers
American television actors
Bisexual musicians
Child pop musicians
Living people
Participants in American reality television series
People from Grays Harbor County, Washington
American LGBT singers
American bisexual actors
LGBT Christians
LGBT people from Washington (state)
Non-binary models
Non-binary musicians
American non-binary actors
Child marriage in the United States
21st-century American LGBT people
Bisexual non-binary people